George Stephen Noga (November 5, 1927 - February 5, 1998) was an American retired infielder, manager and scout in professional baseball. A native of New York, New York, Noga spent the latter portion of his playing days and all of his managing career in the farm system of the Chicago White Sox.

Noga's best season, 1954, was divided between the Colorado Springs Sky Sox of the Class A Western League and the Memphis Chicks of the Double-A Southern Association. He hit .278 with 12 home runs and 62 runs batted in. He managed for 12 years (1956–67) in the ChiSox organization, winning the 1964 Southern League championship as skipper of the Lynchburg White Sox.

After 1967, he scouted for the White Sox, Kansas City Royals and Los Angeles Dodgers, among other organizations.

References

1927 births
1998 deaths
Memphis Chicks players
CCNY Beavers baseball players
Chicago White Sox scouts
Kansas City Royals scouts
Los Angeles Dodgers scouts
Eugene Emeralds managers
Indianapolis Indians managers
Baseball players from New York (state)
Colorado Springs Sky Sox players
Holdrege White Sox players